Wazeecha Lake is a reservoir in the U.S. state of Wisconsin.

Lake Wazeecha was inundated in the 1930s by a dam on Fourmile Creek.

References

Bodies of water of Portage County, Wisconsin
Lakes of Wood County, Wisconsin
Lakes of Wisconsin